The Duke is a 2020 British comedy-drama film directed by Roger Michell, with a screenplay by Richard Bean and Clive Coleman. Dealing with the 1961 theft of the Portrait of the Duke of Wellington, the film stars Jim Broadbent, Helen Mirren, Fionn Whitehead, Anna Maxwell Martin and Matthew Goode. It was Michell's penultimate film before his death on 22 September 2021.

The film was awarded 5 stars from The Guardian and The Daily Telegraph following its world premiere at the Venice Film Festival. It was released in cinemas in the UK on 25 February 2022.

Plot 
Sixty-year-old self-educated working-class Kempton Bunton appears in Court Number 1 at the Old Bailey, pleading not guilty to charges of stealing Goya's portrait of the Duke of Wellington and its frame from the National Gallery in London. Six months earlier, in spring 1961, he had sent a script to the BBC from his native Newcastle upon Tyne. Soon afterwards he is jailed at Durham for 13 days for watching TV without a licence. Although he can afford one, he refuses to do so as he is campaigning against pensioners having to pay it, part of his wider strong beliefs about supporting the common man.

Kempton's son Jackie meets him on his release and on their way home they visit the grave of Marion, Jackie's sister, who had been killed in a bicycle accident aged only 18. Kempton's wife Dorothy works as a housekeeper and babysitter for a local councillor and his wife; Jackie aims to become a boat-builder and move away; and his elder brother Kenny lives in Leeds, working in construction but involved in low-level crime. Kempton himself is sacked from his job as a taxi driver due to being over-talkative to passengers and giving a free ride to an impoverished disabled World War One veteran. He gets Dorothy to allow him a two-day trip to London to drum up press and parliamentary attention for his campaign and BBC interest in his scripts, on condition that if he does not get that attention he will give up writing and campaigning and get a job. An unseen man with a north-east English accent steals the painting and after Kempton's return to Newcastle he and Jackie make a false back to a wardrobe to hide it.

Kempton sends a series of ransom notes to the government, saying he will return the painting on condition the elderly be exempted from paying for a TV licence. Kenny and his separated lover Pammy come to visit his parents and she spots the painting in the wardrobe, revealing this to Kempton in private in hopes of getting half the £5,000 reward offered. Panicked, Kempton abandons a suggested Daily Mirror plan to raise money for his campaign via an exhibition of the painting and instead walks into the National Gallery to return it and confess to the theft. Though the case seems hopeless, his barrister Jeremy Hutchinson defends him on the grounds he had no intent to deprive the Gallery of it permanently but instead simply 'borrowed' it to further his campaign, an impression Kempton bolsters by voluble testimony when questioned by Hutchinson.

Back in Newcastle during the early stages of the trial, Jackie reveals to his mother it had in fact been he who stole it for his father to use in his campaign, with his father covering up for him and taking the blame. The jury acquits Kempton of all charges except the theft of the £80 picture frame, which Jackie had removed from the painting at his London lodgings and then lost. After his three-month sentence, Kempton and Dorothy forgive each other over how they had mishandled their grief at Marion's death.  Their reconciliation is evident when they are sitting together in a cinema watching the  James Bond film Dr. No and chuckle when they see the scene which shows Sean Connery spotting the "stolen" Goya painting of the Duke of Wellington.
 
Four years later Jackie admits his guilt to the police, but they and the Director of Public Prosecutions fear that a new trial could lead to Kempton being called as a witness and again becoming an embarrassing cause célèbre. They therefore agree that if Jackie does not go public they will not prosecute. Text at the end of the film states the frame was never recovered and that no plays by Bunton were ever produced, but that, in 2000, TV licences were made free to people over age 75.

Cast 
 Jim Broadbent as Kempton Bunton
 Helen Mirren as Dorothy Bunton
 Fionn Whitehead as Jackie Bunton
 Matthew Goode as Jeremy Hutchinson
 Anna Maxwell Martin as Mrs Gowling
 Jack Bandeira as Kenny Bunton
 Aimée Kelly as Irene
 Joshua McGuire as Eric Crowther, Hutchinson's junior
 Charlotte Spencer as Pammy
 John Heffernan as Neddie Cussen, prosecuting barrister
 Andrew Havill as Sir Philip Hendy, Director of the National Gallery
 James Wilby as Carl Aarvold, judge in Kempton's case
 Heather Craney as Debbie, clerk of the court in Kempton's case
 Richard McCabe as Rab Butler, Home Secretary
 Charles Edwards as Sir Joseph Simpson, Commissioner of the Metropolitan Police
 Sian Clifford as Dr Unsworth, handwriting expert

Production 
It was announced in October 2019 that a film about the 1961 theft was in development, with Broadbent as Bunton and Mirren as his wife and Roger Michell  set to direct. Fionn Whitehead was added the following month.

Filming began in November 2019, with Goode joining the cast. Location shooting took place in Bradford and Leeds, and the production team also used Prime Studios in Leeds.

Release 
The film had its world premiere at the Venice Film Festival on 4 September 2020. It was also selected to screen at the Telluride Film Festival in September 2020, prior to its cancellation due to the COVID-19 pandemic. Shortly after, Sony Pictures Classics acquired the Latin America, Scandivanian and US distribution rights to the film. Pathé's distribution arm will release the film in France and Switzerland.

The film was originally scheduled to be released in the United Kingdom by 20th Century Fox via Walt Disney Studios Motion Pictures on 6 November 2020, but Pathé later delayed it to 2021 due to the COVID-19 pandemic. On 7 June 2021, it was announced that Pathé would release the film on 3 September 2021, after announcing a new distribution deal with Warner Bros. Pictures. On 23 July, Pathé announced that the film release would be again delayed, this time to 25 February 2022.

The Duke was released as a rental home premiere and is available on iTunes, Curzon, Amazon Prime Video, Sky Store, Google Play and Microsoft Store.

It was then available on Blu-ray and DVD on June 13, 2022 by Pathé through Warner Bros. Home Entertainment.

Reception
On the review aggregator website Rotten Tomatoes, 97% of 129 reviews are positive, with an average rating of 7.5/10. The website's critical consensus reads, "A sweet swan song for director Roger Michell, The Duke offers a well-acted and engaging dramatization of an entertainingly improbable true story." Metacritic, which uses a weighted average, assigned a score of 74 out of 100 based on 35 critics, indicating "generally favorable reviews".

See also 
 Vincenzo Peruggia (who stole the Mona Lisa)
 The Art of the Steal (2013 film)

References

External links 
 The Duke - Sony Pictures Classics
 
 

2020 films
2020 comedy-drama films
British comedy-drama films
French comedy-drama films
Films directed by Roger Michell
Films scored by George Fenton
Pathé films
Sony Pictures Classics films
Films set in London
Films set in Newcastle upon Tyne
Warner Bros. films
2020s English-language films
British heist films
Films set in 1961
2020s British films
2020s French films